William Hovgaard (born 1857, Aarhus, Denmark d. 1950, Summit, New Jersey) was a Danish, later Danish American professor of naval design and construction at Massachusetts Institute of Technology until his retirement in 1933.

Hovgaard was one of the foremost authorities on ship design in his generation, especially on the general and structural design of warships. He wrote several books on naval design and construction and the history thereof, but also on a diversity of other subjects, and he received a significant number of orders, awards and merits during his life.

William was the brother of officer of the Danish Navy Andreas Peter Hovgaard, who led an Arctic survey expedition to the Kara Sea on steamship Dijmphna in 1882/83, and after whom Hovgaard Island in Greenland, Hovgaard Island in Antarctica, Hovgaard Island in the Kara Sea, and Hovgaard Islands in Nunavut were named.

Life

According to Hovgaard's National Academy of Sciences biographical memoir,

In 1912 he helped organize the American-Scandinavian Foundation, New York City, and was a Trustee and Vice-President until his death. He was a member of the American Academy of Arts and Sciences, American Geographical Society, Institute of the Aeronautical Sciences, National Academy of Sciences (elected in 1929), Institution of Naval Architects (London), American Society of Naval Architects and Marine Engineers, United States Naval Institute, American Mathematical Society, American Association of University Professors, Society for the Advancement of Scandinavian Study, American Society of Danish Engineers, and the Massachusetts Historical Society. In 1928 he was an Invited Speaker of the ICM in Bologna.

Hovgaard wrote a number of books and scientific articles on a number of subjects. Pertaining to his warship expertise, he wrote Structural Design of Warships (1915) and General Design of Warships and Modern History of Warships (1920).

Books by Hovgaard on other subjects are, among others, The Voyages of the Norsemen to America (1914) where he comments on this subject-matter based on his knowledge on ships and navigation, and The United World (1944).

William Francis Gibbs commented on the latter book, in 1962,

At his death he had for some years been working on a new theory of cosmology, but it remained unfinished.

Career

Hovgaard graduated from the Royal Danish Naval Academy at age 21, and next served as a sub-lieutenant and later as a lieutenant in the Royal Danish Navy. He later attended the Royal Naval College, Greenwich, from which he graduated in 1887. He worked for some years for Burmeister & Wain, before attaining the rank of commander in the Royal Danish Navy. He next transferred to the Massachusetts Institute of Technology, working as a professor, teaching courses such as Warship Design, Theory of Warship Design, and History of Modern Warship Construction.

In 1915 Hovgaard served as an expert witness after the sinking of RMS Titanic (later he would also give testimony on the RMS Lusitania). Later he served as vice-president in The American-Scandinavian Foundation. In 1929, he was appointed to the Department of Commerce's Committee on Ship Construction, and later the same year he became a full member of the National Academy of Sciences.

Hovgaard retired in 1933, but continued to be active as a scientist and naval authority for many years. In 1934 he addressed the American Academy of Arts and Sciences in Boston regarding "Fundamentals of the Theory of Relativity".

In 1937 Hovgaard was honored at a luncheon at the Astor Hotel, under sponsorship of the American Society of Danish Engineers, the Danish Officers' Club, and the Danish Luncheon Club. A letter read at the luncheon from a US naval official noted that 85 percent of the officers in the Navy's construction corps were Hovgaard's former students, and that every one of the Navy's ships currently docked at New York Harbor was constructed under the supervision of his former pupils.

Selected bibliography

Books on Naval Architecture
 1887 Submarine Boats. E.&F. Spon, Ltd. London. 98pp.
 1891 Lectures on Technology. Royal Dockyard. Copenhagen. 195pp.
 1915 Structural Design of Warships. E.&F. Spon, Ltd. London. 384pp.
 1920 Modern History of Warships. E.&F. Spon, Ltd. London. 514pp.
 1920 General Design of Warships. E.&F. Spon, Ltd. London. 307pp.

Books on Non-Naval Architecture Subjects
 1887 Sundhed eller Kundskaber. Emil Bergman. Copenhagen. 80pp.
 1888 Sport. Emil Bergman. Copenhagen. 174pp.
 1914 The Voyages of the Norsemen in America. American Scandinavian Foundation. New York. 304pp.

Articles
 1925 The Norsemen in Greenland: Recent Discoveries at Herjolfsnes, Geographical Review
 1926 The Arsenal in Piraeus and the Ancient Building Rules, ''Isis

Other
 Papers stored at the MIT

Honours and awards
 Order of the Redeemer, Greece (1889)
 Order of Franz Joseph (Austrian Empire) (1890)
 Order of St. Anna (Russia) (1901)
 Order of St. Stanislaus (Russia) (1901)
 Honorary Member, Royal Institution of Naval Architects, awarded for his work on buoyancy and stability of submarines.
  Commander of the Order of the Dannebrog (1927)
 Honorary Doctorate, Doctor of Engineering, Polyteknisk Læreanstalt (1929)
 Member, National Academy of Sciences (elected in 1929)
 Lifetime member, Society of Naval Architects and Marine Engineers (1932)
 Honorary Doctorate, Doctor of Engineering, Stevens Institute (1934)
 Naval Order of Spain (1936)
 David W. Taylor Medal (1943)
 Gold medal for distinguished service to America and Scandinavia, American-Scandinavian Foundation (1948)

See also
 Contents of 10 manuscript boxes, 1 legal-size manuscript box and 1 cassette box on, and donated by, Hovgaard at MIT

References
 Biographical note from MIT 
 National Academy of Sciences. William Hovgaard 1857—1950 A Biographical Memoir by William Francis Gibbs 

1857 births
1950 deaths
19th-century Danish naval officers
20th-century Danish naval officers
Graduates of the Royal Naval College, Greenwich
People from Aarhus
Massachusetts Institute of Technology faculty
Commanders of the Order of the Dannebrog
Danish naval architects
Danish emigrants to the United States